Senio Kelemete (born May 10, 1990) is an American football offensive guard who is currently a free agent. He attended the University of Washington from 2008 to 2011. Kelemete has also played with the Arizona Cardinals, New Orleans Saints, and Houston Texans.

High school career
A native of Seattle, Washington, Kelemete attended Evergreen High School, where he was a four-year starter on the varsity football team. As a junior in 2006, he earned first-team all-league as both and offensive and defensive lineman as he helped the team to an 8–2 record. In 2007, Evergreen went 9–2 and went the state playoffs for the first time since 2001 while Kelemete was honored as the Seamount League's Lineman of the Year on both offense and defense.

Regarded as a three-star recruit by Rivals.com, Kelemete was ranked as the No. 45 offensive tackle prospect in his class. He chose Washington over offers from California, and Oregon State. The Huskies recruited Kelemete as a defensive lineman.

College career
In his true freshman season, Kelemete played in eight of the Huskies' 12 games as a defensive tackle, including four starts: vs. BYU, Oklahoma, Stanford, and Arizona. In the off-season, he was moved over to offensive line, and started 11 of the Huskies' 12 games at right guard (all but UCLA) in 2009. He earned honorable mention All-Pac-10 honors and was named the John P. Angel Lineman of the Year at the Huskies' postseason awards banquet.

For his junior year, Kelemete was moved from guard to left tackle and named team captain. He started all 13 games, one of only two UW o-linemen to do so. Still a team captain in 2011, Kelemete started all 13 games at left tackle again, and was named second-team All-Pac-12. He was a member of the North team at the 2012 Senior Bowl.

Professional career
Projected as a fourth round selection by Sports Illustrated, he was ranked as the No. 9 offensive guard prospect. Kelemete was praised for his "great use of body positioning and blocking angles," but criticized for his lack of "top footwork in pass protection."

Arizona Cardinals
The Arizona Cardinals selected Kelemete in the fifth round (151st overall) of the 2012 NFL Draft. The Arizona Cardinals selected three offensive linemen in 2012, including Bobby Massie (fourth round) and Nate Potter (seventh round). Kelemete was the highest UW offensive lineman selected since Joe Toledo in 2006.

In his first NFL game against the San Francisco 49ers, Kelemete became the first offensive lineman in NFL history to make a reception in his debut when he caught a deflected Brian Hoyer pass intended for wide receiver Andre Roberts for 10 yards.

New Orleans Saints
He was signed to the New Orleans Saints' practice squad on September 2, 2013. He was released on September 24, 2013, but was re-signed to their practice squad on September 26, 2013. On March 4, 2016, the Saints re-signed Kelemete to a two-year deal.

In 2017, Kelemete's versatility was on display as the Saints' primary backup guard and tackle, starting eight games at both guard and tackle spots.

Houston Texans
On March 14, 2018, Kelemete signed a three-year contract with the Houston Texans. He was named the starting left guard to begin the 2018 season. He started 14 games, missing two due to injury. On September 25, 2019, Kelemete was placed on injured reserve.

On July 27, 2020, Kelemete signed a one-year contract extension with the Texans. He was released by the Texans on February 23, 2021.

San Francisco 49ers
On June 11, 2021, Kelemete signed a one-year contract with the San Francisco 49ers. He was released on August 31, 2021 and re-signed to the practice squad the next day.

Los Angeles Chargers
On October 12, 2021, Kelemete was signed by the Los Angeles Chargers off the 49ers practice squad.

On June 14, 2022, the New Orleans Saints hosted Kelemete for a workout, but no deal was reached.

Personal life
Senio is married to Giovana Kelemete, mother to Senio Jr.

References

External links
Houston Texans bio
Arizona Cardinals bio
Washington Huskies bio

1990 births
Living people
Players of American football from Seattle
American sportspeople of Samoan descent
American football offensive linemen
Washington Huskies football players
Arizona Cardinals players
New Orleans Saints players
Houston Texans players
San Francisco 49ers players
Los Angeles Chargers players